is a tumulus, known as a kofun in Japanese, located in Ikaruga, Nara Prefecture, Japan. It is estimated to date from the later half of the sixth century or the late seventh century.  The burial mound is about 40 or 48 metres in diameter, nine metres in height, and the stone chamber the mound covers is sixteen metres in length. Excavation began in 1985. The tomb yielded gilt-bronze ornaments, horse trappings, and a stone coffin.

The tomb's appearance is supplemented by the harness excavated in the tomb which is a Chinese product imported via the Korean Peninsula. Michio Maezono (Professor, Nara College of Arts) and Taichiro Shiraishi (Professor, Nara University) argue that it is highly possible Prince Anahobe (uncle of Prince Shōtoku, assassinated by Soga no Umako) and Prince Yakabe (prince of Emperor Senka) are the ones that were buried in this tumulus, because the tumulus was built when an assassination happened in June 587 according to "Nihonshoki" (Chronicles of Japan). Additionally, Iō Yūsuke stated that the native Japanese people of the day did not know the "meaning of the ornamental patterns carved on saddle fittings" nor "how to make such fittings". On the other hand, Yamamoto Tadanao of Tenri University claims that some masks and sculptures exhibit the Northern Wei Chinese style.

Looting

It is not known exactly how Fujinoki Tomb managed to stay relatively untouched, as monks are unlikely to have served as responsible guardians over the years. However, there is still evidence that some theft occurred, as the sarcophagus is chipped on one corner, indicating that thieves have entered and attempted to pry off its lid. There are also a number of extra, unmatched lids amongst the pottery, and the pottery that is present is all moved to one side of the room. It is likely that any thieves were caught in the act, as many of the remaining goods are wrapped in cloth and placed where they would not be easily seen. While some of the contents of the tomb have been pilfered, the tomb has managed to stay mostly undisturbed.

Horse-trappings
Although there are many theories that speculate when horse-riding began in Japan, there appears to be very little evidence that indicates horses were ridden before the fifth century. Instead, the best piece of evidence that provides proof of actual riding are wooden stirrups that appear in the earlier portion of the fifth century  The grand category of items that are considered "horse-trappings" consists of wooden items (stirrups, saddles with gilt-bronze parts, and cheek plates) and iron (armor for horses, armor for riders, and weapons for the riders as well).

In Fujinoki tomb
Similar to the Otani tomb in Wakayama, the Fujinoki tomb had a remarkable amount of horse-trappings, more horse-trappings than any other tomb. There also appear to be multiple “sets” of trappings in Fujinoki. A set consists of pieces such as saddle parts, stirrups, and bits.  Half of the pieces have missing counterparts. The bits that are found in the Fujinoki tomb differ from what was typically found in Japan, a mouthpiece consisting of two linked sections instead of a single rod. No such bits have been found in Fujinoki and it has been suggested that the bits were instead made of rawhide rope, since metal was rare and costly in various parts of Asia.

"Giant" trappings
Late in the evolution of riding gear, giant trappings make an appearance mainly as status symbols. Giant trappings were merely show pieces and there was almost no possibility that they were worn, as these giant trappings would not have paired nicely at the time with the small physical size of horses that would have been ridden in Japan. Among the giant trappings found in Fujinoki, the characteristics of the stirrups recovered resembled that of a sixth-century style. Unlike the stirrups in other sites, the example discovered in Fujinoki was decently-preserved and the features were actually recognizable. This example consisted of three slightly curved bars that joined at the top to complete a bronze frame that was floored by a foot piece made of wood. Additionally, an attachment was made by a linked chain connecting to a strap that crossed the back of the saddle. Unfortunately, the stirrup found in Fujinoki is broken and multiple, large parts are missing that would have composed the remains of the reinforcing frame. The giant trappings were merely show pieces and the extent of their use may have been solely as burial goods.

Saddle Bows
Also found in Fujinoki was the remnants of a saddle, which were not often found in their entirety in other tombs. This saddle was adorned with gilt-bronze, arc-shaped ornaments that were attached to the wooden cantles. The saddle mainly consisted of two bows, in the front and the rear, which would have had straps that looped under the accompanying part of the horse for stability. These bows had a section dedicated to decoration that was reinforced by a thick, heavy outer frame and a thick, lower arc for buckles. Only the rear bow had a special middle piece that was completely missing from the front bow. The rear bow appeared to be less extravagant and lacked decoration, indicating this was an afterthought, while the front bow’s ornamentation was full and complete.

See also
History of Japan
Kitora Tomb
Takamatsuzuka Tomb

Notes

References
Kipfer, Barbara Ann. (2000), Encyclopedic dictionary of archaeology, Springer, 
Shively, Donald H.; McCullough, William H., Hall, John Whitney. (1993), The Cambridge history of Japan, Volume 2, Cambridge University Press, 
Kidder, J. Edward, Jr. "The Fujinoki Tomb and Its Grave Goods." Monumenta Nipponica Spring 42.1 (1987): 57-87. JSTOR. Web. 17 Mar. 2015. <https://www.jstor.org/stable/2385039>. 
Kidder, J. Edward, Jr. "The Fujinoki Sarcophagus." Monumenta Nipponica Winter 44.4 (1989): 415-60. JSTOR. Web. 17 Mar. 2015. <https://www.jstor.org/stable/2384537>.

External links

Fujinoki Tumulus
Hong Wontak

Asuka period
Kofun
Classical Japan
Buildings and structures in Nara Prefecture
History of Nara Prefecture
Tourist attractions in Nara Prefecture
Historic Sites of Japan